Chlidichthys clibanarius, the chainmail dottyback, is a species of fish in the family Pseudochromidae.

Description

Distribution and habitat
Chlidichthys clibanarius is found only in the Western Indian Ocean from the from the Comoros, Aldabra in the Seychelles, and in northern Madagascar.

References

Pseudoplesiopinae
Taxa named by Anthony C. Gill
Taxa named by Alasdair James Edwards
Fish described in 2004